First Empire may refer to:
First British Empire, sometimes used to describe the British Empire between 1583 and 1783
First Bulgarian Empire (680–1018)
First French Empire (1804–1814/1815) 
First German Empire or "First Reich", sometimes used to describe the Holy Roman Empire (962–1806)
First Empire of Haiti (1804–1806)
First Mexican Empire (1821–1823)
First Persian Empire, sometimes used to describe the Achaemenid Empire (ca. 550 BCE – 336 BCE)
1st Empire Awards, film awards held in 1996

See also 
Second Empire (disambiguation)
Third Empire (disambiguation)